The 1959–60 Romanian Hockey League season was the 30th season of the Romanian Hockey League. Six teams participated in the league, and Vointa Miercurea Ciuc won the championship.

Regular season

External links
hochei.net

Rom
Romanian Hockey League seasons
1959–60 in Romanian ice hockey